Kladirostratus is a genus of snakes of the family Lamprophiidae. Members of this genus are known as Branch's beaked snakes.

Taxonomy 
Both members of Kladirostratus were originally placed in Psammophylax, but morphological and genetic evidence revealed that the species form a lineage that is sister to Psammophylax.

Species
 Kladirostratus acutus (Günther, 1888) - striped beaked snake, beaked skaapstekker 
 Kladirostratus togoensis (Matschie, 1893) - northern sharp-nosed skaapsteker

References

Kladirostratus
Snake genera